This is a list of encyclopedias by language.

Albanian
Encyclopedias written in Albanian.

 Albanian Encyclopedic Dictionary: published by Academy of Sciences of Albania;
 First Edition (1985; FESH)
 New Edition (2008/09; Botimi i ri, FESH II)
Encyclopedia of Yugoslavia (Albanian edition, 1984): the first encyclopedia published in Albanian
Albanian Wikipedia (Wikipedia shqip)

Arabic

Encyclopedias written in Arabic.

 Global Arabic Encyclopedia
 King Abdullah Bin Abdulaziz Arabic Health Encyclopedia
 Marefa
 Mawdoo3
 Arabic Wikipedia

Armenian
Encyclopedias written in Armenian.

 Armenian Soviet Encyclopedia

Azerbaijani
Encyclopedias written in Azerbaijani.

 Azerbaijani Soviet Encyclopedia
 National Encyclopedia of Azerbaijan
Azerbaijani Wikipedia
South Azerbaijani Wikipedia

Basque
Encyclopedias written in Basque

Basque Wikipedia
Auñamendi Eusko Entziklopedia

Belarusian
Encyclopedias written in Belarusian

Belarusian Encyclopedia (1996–2004)  (Беларуская энцыклапедыя)
Belarusian Soviet Encyclopedia (1969–1976)  (Беларуская савецкая энцыклапедыя)

Bengali
 Bishwakosh: 22 volumes, edited by Rangalal Mukhopadhyay, Troilokyanath Mukhopadhyay and Nagendranath Basu
 Banglapedia
 Bengali Wikipedia
 Islami Bishwakosh

Bulgarian

Encyclopedias written in Bulgarian.

Concise Bulgarian Encyclopedia  (Кратка българска енциклопедия; 1963–1969)
Danchovi Bros Bulgarian Encyclopedia  (Българска енциклопедия на Братя Данчови; 1936)
Encyclopedia Bulgaria (1981-1997)  (Енциклопедия България)
Bulgarian Wikipedia (Уикипедия на български език)

Catalan
Encyclopedias written in Catalan.

 Gran Enciclopèdia Catalana (Catalan Encyclopedia)
 Catalan Wikipedia

Chinese
Encyclopedias written in Chinese.

Croatian
Encyclopedias written in Croatian.

Enciklopedija hrvatske umjetnosti (1995–1996) (Encyclopedia of Croatian Art)
Filmska enciklopedija (1986–1990) (Film Encyclopedia)
General Encyclopedia of the Yugoslavian Lexicographical Institute (Opća enciklopedija Jugoslavenskog leksikografskog zavoda)
Hrvatska enciklopedija (1999–2007) (Croatian Encyclopedia)
Istarska enciklopedija (2005) (Istrian Encyclopedia)
Krležijana (1993–1999) (Encyclopedia of Miroslav Krleža)
Medicinska enciklopedija (1967–1986) (Medical Encyclopedia)
Pomorska enciklopedija (1972–1989) (Naval Encyclopedia)
Proleksis Encyclopedia (Proleksis enciklopedija)
Tehnička enciklopedija (1963–1997) (Technical Encyclopedia)
Croatian Wikipedia (Wikipedija na hrvatskom jeziku)

Czech
Encyclopedias written in Czech.

Riegrův slovník naučný (11 volumes, 1860–1874, supplement vol. 1890, online)
Stručný všeobecný slovník věcný (9 volumes, 1874–1885, online)
Otto's encyclopedia (Ottův slovník naučný, 28 vols., 1888–1909, 12 supplement vols., Ottův slovník naučný nové doby (incomplete), 1930–1943, volumes 1–28 online)
Příruční slovník všeobecných vědomostí (2 volumes, 1882–1887, editor Josef Rank, vol 1 online)
Masarykův slovník naučný (7 volumes, 1925–1933)
B. Kočího Malý slovník naučný (2 volumes, 1925–1929, online)
Nový velký ilustrovaný Slovník naučný (22 volumes, 1929–1934, online)
Komenského slovník naučný (10 volumes, 1937–1938)
Příruční slovník naučný (PSN, 4 volumes, 1962–1967)
Malý encyklopedický slovník A-Ž (1 volume, 1972)
Ilustrovaný encyklopedický slovník (IES, 3 volumes, 1980–1982)
Malá československá encklopedie (MČSE, 6 volumes, 1984–1987)
Diderot (8 volumes, 1999–2000)
Universum (10 volumes, 1999–2001)
Czech Wikipedia (2002–)

Danish

Encyclopedias written in Danish.

Den Store Danske Encyklopædi
Salmonsens Konversationsleksikon
Danish Wikipedia

Dutch

Encyclopedias written in Dutch.

Eerste Nederlandse Systematisch Ingerichte Encyclopaedie (abbr. E.N.S.I.E., "First Dutch Systematically Arranged Encyclopaedia")
Grote Nederlandse Larousse Encyclopedie (1971–1979)
Grote Spectrum Encyclopedie (1974–1980)
Oosthoek's Geïllustreerde Encyclopaedie (1916–1923; 7th ed. 1976–1981)
Winkler Prins Geïllustreerde Encyclopaedie (1870–1882; 2nd ed. 1884–1888)
Dutch Wikipedia (Nederlandstalige Wikipedia)

Egyptian Arabic
 Egyptian Arabic Wikipedia: a Wikipedia encyclopedia written in Egyptian Arabic language.

English
Encyclopedias written in English.
Academic American Encyclopedia
American Heritage New Pictorial Encyclopedic Guide to the United States (1965)
The American Peoples Encyclopedia (1948- 76); the 1948 edition was a 20-volume set published by Spencer Press, Inc., marketed by Sears Roebuck and Company; the 1962 edition was a revised 20-volume set published by Grolier Incorporated, and marketed by its subsidiary, The Richards Company, Inc.
Asian Encyclopedia of Law: legal encyclopedia from Lawi
 Banglapedia: national encyclopedia of Bangladesh, available in English and Bengali
 Barkham Burroughs' Encyclopaedia (1889), American encyclopedia and miscellany
Book of Knowledge
Britannica Junior
British Encyclopedia, or Dictionary of Arts and Sciences: 1809, 6 volumes
The British Encyclopedia: 1933, 10 volumes
Cambridge Encyclopedia: one-volume encyclopedia from Cambridge University Press
Canadian Encyclopedia: originally a multi-volume print encyclopedia from Hurtig Publishers focusing on Canadian topics (founded 1985); now a free, online-only publication of the Historica Dominion Institute
Chambers's Encyclopaedia (1859–1979)
The Children's Encyclopedia
Collier's Encyclopedia (1951–1998)
Collins Encyclopedia of Scotland: one-volume encyclopedia
Columbia Encyclopedia: one-volume encyclopedia from Columbia University Press
The Complete Compendium of Universal Knowledge (1891)
Compton's Encyclopedia: 26-volume encyclopedia
Cyclopædia, or an Universal Dictionary of Arts and Sciences (1728–1788)
Dictionary of the Middle Ages (1982–1989)
The Domestic Encyclopedia (1802, Am. editions 1803, 1821)
Encarta, digital multimedia encyclopedia by Microsoft
Encyclopædia Biblica: published in 1899
Encyclopædia Britannica: in print 1768–2010, online since 1994; see also the 1911 Encyclopædia Britannica
Encyclopædia Britannica Ultimate Reference Suite: available on DVD
 Encyclopædia Iranica: history and contemporary topics related to Iranian peoples
Encyclopedia Americana
Encyclopedia Judaica: 26-volume English-language encyclopedia of the Jewish people and Judaism
Encyclopedia of Associations: also available online as Associations Unlimited
Encyclopedia of Distances: Springer-Verlag 2009
Encyclopedia of Law: 120.000-entry legal encyclopedia with a legal dictionary and legal thesaurus
Encyclopedia of Life: online collaborative encyclopedia intended to document all of the living species known to science
Encyclopedia of New Zealand: country-specific historical encyclopedia, with contemporary topics
 Encyclopaedia of Wales: one volume, also available in Welsh
Funk & Wagnalls Standard Encyclopedia
Global Encyclopedia: Grolier publication during the 1980s
Grolier Multimedia Encyclopedia
Kendal's Pocket Encyclopedia (1802, second edition 1811)
Lexicon Technicum (1704–1744)
Low's Encyclopaedia (1805–1811)
Merit Students Encyclopedia (1967–1992)
The Minor Encyclopedia (1803)
National Geographic Encyclopedia
New American Cyclopedia (1857–1866)
New American Desk Encyclopedia: small paperback encyclopedia
 New International Encyclopaedia (1902–1927)
 The Nuttall Encyclopaedia: 1900
Oracle Encyclopædia: five-volume encyclopedia published in 1895
Pears Cyclopaedia: one-volume encyclopaedia published annually in the United Kingdom (1897-2017)
The Penguin Encyclopedia: one-volume encyclopedia published by the Penguin Group
The Poets' Encyclopedia
Random House Encyclopedia: one-volume encyclopedia from Random House
 TV Tropes (2004)
The Volume Library by Southwestern, 3-volume compendium with aspects of dictionary, almanac and encyclopedia
 English Wikipedia (2001)
 Simple English Wikipedia (2003)
World Book Encyclopedia: world's best selling print encyclopedia

Esperanto
Encyclopedias written in Esperanto.

 Enciklopedio de Esperanto: two-volume encyclopedia about Esperanto issues (Budapest 1934); reprint in one volume, without the illustrations (1986)
 Esperanto en perspektivo: encyclopedic handbook about Esperanto issues (Rotterdam and London 1974)
 Esperanto Wikipedia (2001)

Estonian
Encyclopedias written in Estonian.

Eesti Entsüklopeedia (1932–1937)
Eesti nõukogude entsüklopeedia (1968–1976)
Eesti nõukogude entsüklopeedia (ENE) (1985–1990) / Eesti entsüklopeedia (EE) (1990–2006)
Eesti Üleüldise teaduse raamat ehk encyklopädia konversationi-lexikon: by Karl August Hermann (1900–1906)
ENEKE (1982–1986)
Estonica
TEA entsüklopeedia (2008)
Estonian Wikipedia (2002)

Finnish
Encyclopedias written in Finnish.

 Facta (1969–1974)
 Facta 2001
 Factum (2003–2005)
 Iso tietosanakirja (1931–1958)
 Otavan iso tietosanakirja – Encyclopedia Fennica (1960–1965)
 Pieni tietosanakirja (1925–1928)
 Spectrum Tietokeskus (1976–1987)
 Tiedon Värikäs Maailma (1972–1980)
 Tietosanakirja (1909–1922)
 Uusi tietosanakirja (1929)
 Uusi Tietosanakirja (1960–1972)
 Finnish Wikipedia (Suomenkielinen Wikipedia)

French
Encyclopedias written in French.

Claude Augé Nouveau Petit Larousse Illustré
Découvertes Gallimard: illustrated encyclopaedia in pocket format (1986–)
Encyclopædia Britannica: translated into French
Encyclopædia Universalis (1968–)
Encyclopédie (1751–1772)
Encyclopédie berbère (1984–)
Encyclopédie Méthodique: Panckoucke; 1782–1832
Encyclopédie nouvelle: Pierre Leroux and Jean Reynaud; 1839–1840
Grand Dictionnaire Encyclopédique Larousse
Grand dictionnaire universel du XIXe siècle: by Pierre Larousse (17 volumes 1866–1877); really an encyclopedia despite its name
Grand Larousse encyclopédique (1960–1964)
La Grande Encyclopédie: general secretaries of the editorial board Ferdinand-Camille Dreyfus and André Berthelot (31 volumes 1886–1902)
Nouveau Larousse illustré (1897–1904)
French Wikipedia (Wikipédia francophone)

Galician
Encyclopedias written in Galician.

Enciclopedia Galega Universal: on paper and online
Gran Enciclopedia Galega Silverio Cañada: on paper and DVD
Galician Wikipedia (Wikipedia en galego)

Georgian
Encyclopedias written in Georgian.

Georgian Soviet Encyclopedia

German
Encyclopedias written in German.

The Austro-Hungarian Monarchy in Word and Picture (1886–1902)
Bertelsmann Lexikothek (1967)
Brockhaus Enzyklopädie: in print 1796–2006, online-only since 2014
Conversations-Lexikon mit vorzüglicher Rücksicht auf die gegenwärtigen Zeiten (1796–1808; see Brockhaus)
Grosses vollständiges Universal-Lexicon (1751–1754)
Herders Konversations-Lexikon (1854–1857; 2nd ed. 1875–1879)
Meyers Konversations-Lexikon (1839–1855; 5th ed. 1893–1897)
Oekonomische Encyklopädie (General System of State, City, Home and Agriculture) Editor Johann Georg Krünitz (242 Volumes 1773–1858)
Pierers Universal-Lexikon (1824–1836; 7th ed. 1888–1893)
German Wikipedia (Deutsche Wikipedia)

Greek
Encyclopedias written in Greek.

 Encyclopedic lexicon: by P. Gerakakis, I–V volumes, 1861–1865 (Γερακάκης, Πέτρος. Λεξικόν εγκυκλοπαίδειας: περιέχον τα κυριωτέρα των επιστημών και τεχνών)
Helios: Νεώτερον Εγκυκλοπαιδικόν Λεξικόν, Ήλιος (1945)
Papyrus Larousse Britannica: Πάπυρος - Λαρούς - Μπριτάννικα (1975–2004)
Suda: historical encyclopedia of the ancient Mediterranean world (10th century)
Greek Wikipedia (Ελληνική Βικιπαίδεια)

Gujarati
Encyclopedias written in Gujarati.

Bhagavadgomandal: completed around by Bhagvatsingh of Gondal with the help of his education minister Chandulal Patel
Gujarati Vishwakosh (1985–2009)

Hebrew
Encyclopedias written in Hebrew.

Encyclopaedia Hebraica
Encyclopedia of the Holocaust
Hebrew Wikipedia

Hindi
Encyclopedias written in Hindi.

Agropedia
Hindi Wikipedia
Hindi Vishvakosh (1969-1970)
Webkosh
Hindi translation complete

Hungarian
Encyclopedias written in Hungarian.

 List of Hungarian encyclopedias

Icelandic
Encyclopedias written in Icelandic.

Íslenska alfræðiorðabókin A-Ö

Ido
Encyclopedias written in Ido.

 Ido Wikipedia

Indonesian
Encyclopedias written in Indonesian language.

Ensiklopedi Islam
Ensiklopedi Nasional Indonesia
Ensiklopedi umum dalam bahasa Indonesia
Indonesian Wikipedia (Wikipedia in Indonesia)

Italian
Encyclopedias written in Italian.

 Conoscere (1958–1963)
 Dizionario Biografico degli Italiani
 Dizionario enciclopedico italiano (1955–)
 Dizionario enciclopedico universale (1995), two-volume Corriere della Sera encyclopedia 
 Dizionario storico della Svizzera 
 Enciclopedia Biografica Universale, Treccani
 Enciclopedia italiana di scienze, lettere ed arti (1929–1960)
 Federico II. Enciclopedia fridericiana, three-volume encyclopaedic work, entirely devoted to the emperor Frederick II and his time
 Vita meravigliosa
 Italian Wikipedia (Wikipedia in italiano)

Japanese
Encyclopedias written in Japanese.

 The Heibonsha World Encyclopedia (世界大百科事典 Sekai Dai-hyakka Jiten)

Kazakh
Encyclopedias translated into Kazakh.

 Great Soviet Encyclopedia

Korean
Encyclopedias written in Korean.

 Doosan Encyclopedia
 Encyclopedia of Korean Culture
 Global World Encyclopedia
 Great Korean Encyclopedia
 Jibong yuseol
 Kwangmyong Encyclopedia
 Korean Wikipedia

Kurdish
Encyclopedias written in Kurdish.

 Kurdistanica (1992)

Kyrgyz
Encyclopedias written in Kyrgyz.

 Great Soviet Encyclopedia

Latin
Encyclopedias written in Latin.

 De proprietatibus rerum: of Bartholomeus Anglicus
 Etymologiae: of Isidore of Seville
 Fons memorabilium universi: of Domenico Bandini of Arezzo
 Liber de natura rerum: of Thomas of Cantimpré
 Naturalis Historia: of Pliny the Elder
 Nine Books of Disciplines: by Marcus Terentius Varro
 Speculum Maius: of Vincent of Beauvais
 Latin Wikipedia

Latvian 
Encyclopedias written in Latvian.

Latviešu konversācijas vārdnīca, 1927–1940
Latvijas padomju enciklopēdija, 1981–1988
 Latvian Wikipedia (2003)

Leonese 
Encyclopedias written in Leonese.

 Llionpedia (2009)

Lithuanian 
Encyclopedias written in Lithuanian.

Macedonian
Encyclopedias written in Macedonian.

Encyclopedia of Yugoslavia: Macedonian edition; the first encyclopedia published in Macedonian
Macedonian Wikipedia (Википедија)

Malagasy
Encyclopedias written in Malagasy.

Rakibolana Rakipahalalana
Malagasy Wikipedia

Malayalam
Encyclopedias written in Malayalam.

 Malayalam Britannica
  Puranic Encyclopedia Vettom Mani: published By DC Books
Sarva Vijyana Kosham
 Viswa Sahitya Vijnanakosam
 Malayalam Wikipedia

Norwegian
Encyclopedias written in Norwegian.

Caplex
Store norske leksikon
Norwegian Wikipedia

Persian
Encyclopedias written in Persian.

Dehkhoda Dictionary (Loghatnameh Dehkhoda)
Encyclopaedia of Persian Language and Literature
Encyclopedia of Iran and Islam
The Encyclopedia of Iranian Old Music (2000)
Encyclopedia of Islam World
Encyclopedia Islamica
The Persian Encyclopedia
Encyclopedia of Sophistication (2003)
Treasure Box of Knowledge (1993)
Persian Wikipedia (2004)

Polish
Encyclopedias written in Polish.

Britannica (Encyclopædia Britannica - Polish edition): 49 vols (1997-2005)
Encyklopedia białych plam: 20 vols (2000-2006)
Encyklopedia nowej generacji E2.0 (2008)
Encyklopedia ogólna wiedzy ludzkiej: 12 vols (1872-1877)
Encyklopedia podręczna ilustrowana według 2 najnowszego wydania "Macierzy Polskiej" we Lwowie, uzupełniona i opracowana do użytku naszych czytelników: 4 vols (1906)
Encyklopedia Polski (Encyclopedia of Poland; 1996)
Encyklopedia popularna ilustrowana treść wszystkich gałęzi wiedzy ludzkiej, podana przystępnie 4 vols (1909-1912)
Encyklopedia Powszechna Kieszonkowa (1888)
Encyklopedia Powszechna PWN: 4 vols (1973-1976)
Encyklopedia Powszechna PWN: 30 vols (2009-2010)
Encyklopedia Powszechna Ultima Thule: 10 vols (1927-1939)
Encyklopedia staropolska ilustrowana: 4 vols (1900-1903)
Great Encyclopedia of PWN (Wielka Encyklopedia PWN): 31 vols (2001-2005)
Great Universal Encyclopedia of PWN (Wielka Encyklopedia Powszechna PWN) : 12 vols (1962-1970)
Ilustrowana encyklopedia: 6 vols (1925-1938)
Internet PWN Encyclopedia (Internetowa encyklopedia PWN): also referred to as Nowa Encyklopedia Powszechna PWN; a free Internet encyclopedia published by PWN
Nowa Encyklopedia Powszechna PWN: 8 vols (2004)
Nowe Ateny Albo Akademiia Wszelkiej Sciencyi Pełna, Na Różne Tytuły Jak Na Classes Podzielona, Mądrym Dla Memoryjału, Idiotom Dla Nauki, Politykom Dla Praktyki, Melankolikom Dla Rozrywki Erygowana (1745-1746)
Popularna encyklopedia powszechna 20 vols (1994-1998)
S.Orgelbranda Encyklopedia Powszechna: edition I (1859-1868), edition II (1872-1876), edition III (1898, Orgelbranda Encyklopedia powszechna z ilustracjami i mapami); 28 vols
Wielka encyklopedia Oxford: 20 vols (2008)
Wielka encyklopedia powszechna ilustrowana: 55 vols (1890-1914)
Wielka ilustrowana encyklopedia powszechna: 20 vols (1929-1938)
Zbiór potrzebniejszych wiadomości (1781)
 Polish Wikipedia

Portuguese
Encyclopedias written in Portuguese.

Barsa -
Biblioteca Universal: published by Texto Editora (paper, multimedia and online)
Diciopédia: published by Porto Editora (multimedia and online)
 Enciclopédia Luso-Brasileira de Cultura: published by Editorial Verbo (1963–1995); 22 volumes
 Enciclopédia Verbo Edição Século XXI: published by Editorial Verbo (since 1998); 29 volumes
Grande Enciclopédia Portuguesa e Brasileira: 40 volumes and later supplements (since 1936)
Infopédia: published by Porto Editora (online)
 Portuguese Wikipedia

Romanian 
Encyclopedias written in Romanian.

 Dicționar enciclopedic român (1962–1966)
 Enciclopedia Cugetarea (1940, 1999)
 Enciclopedia Română (1899–1904)
 Lexiconul Tehnic Român (1948–1968)
 Romanian Wikipedia 
Also, encyclopedias written in Moldavian:
 Encyclopedia of Literature and Art of Moldavia ("Enciclopedia literaturii și a artei din Moldova"): a two-volume encyclopedia published by the Redacţia Principală  Enciclopediei Sovietice Moldoveneşti, in 1985-1986
 Moldavian Soviet Encyclopedia ("Enciclopedia sovietico-moldoveană"): an eight-volume encyclopedia published by the Redacţia Principală  Enciclopediei Sovietice Moldoveneşti, in 1970-1981
 Popular Medical Encyclopedia ("Enciclopedia medicală curentă"): a one-volume encyclopedia published by the Redacţia Principală  Enciclopediei Sovietice Moldoveneşti, in 1984
 Moldavian Wikipedia (closed)

Russian

 Encyclopedias written in Russian.
Brockhaus and Efron Encyclopedic Dictionary (Энциклопедический словарь Брокгауза и Ефрона, 1890–1906)
Encyclopedia of Domestic Animation (Энциклопедия отечественной мультипликации)
 Encyclopedic lexicon (Энциклопедический лексикон): not finished, letters А–Д (1834–1841)
 Geographical-statistical dictionary of Russian Empire (Географическо-статистический словарь Российской Империи) (1863–1885)
Great Russian Encyclopedia (Большая Российская энциклопедия, БРЭ)
Great Soviet Encyclopedia (Большая Советская энциклопедия, БСЭ)
Soviet Encyclopedic Dictionary (Советский Энциклопедический Словарь, СЭС)
Russian Wikipedia (Русская Википедия)

Sanskrit 
Encyclopedias written in Sanskrit 

 Brihat Samhita:of Varāhamihira
 Siribhoovalaya:of Kumudendu Muni
 Sanskrit Wikipedia
 Abhidharma Mahāvibhāṣa Śāstra

Serbian
Encyclopedias written in Serbian.

Encyclopædia Britannica (concise edition, Serbian translation)
Encyclopedia of Yugoslavia  (Енциклопедија Југославије; 1955–1971)
General Encyclopedia of the Yugoslavian Lexicographical Institute (Opća enciklopedija Jugoslavenskog leksikografskog zavoda)
Mala Prosvetina Enciklopedija (1985) (Мала Просветина Енциклопедија - Prosveta's Small Encyclopedia)
Srpska Porodična Enciklopedija (Српска Породична Енциклопедија - Serbian Family Encyclopedia)
Vojna Enciklopedija (Војна Енциклопедија - Military Encyclopedia)
Serbian Wikipedia (Википедија на српском језику)

Sinhalese
Encyclopedias written in Sinhala.

Sinhalese Encyclopaedia (සිංහල විශ්වකෝෂය)
 Sinhalese Wikipedia (සිංහල විකිපීඩියා)

Slovak 
Encyclopedias written in Slovak.

Slovenský náučný slovník. 3 volumes 1932. First general encyclopedia in Slovak language. 
Pyramída. Published between 1971 and 1990 in journal form (224 issues).
Encyklopédia Slovenska. 6 volumes, 1977–1982. Focused on Slovakia.
Malá slovenská encyklopédia. 1 volume 1993
Encyclopaedia Beliana. 20 planned volumes, 1999–, 9 volumes published as of 2021
Všeobecný encyklopedický slovník. 2002, four volumes
Slovak Wikipedia. 2003–
Univerzum – všeobecná obrazová encyklopédia A - Ž. 1 volume, 2011

Slovene
Encyclopedias written in Slovene.

Enciklopedija Slovenije
Slovene Wikipedia (Slovenska Wikipedija)

Spanish
Encyclopedias written in Spanish.

Barsa
Diccionario Enciclopédico Espasa
Diccionario Enciclopédico Hispano-Americano de Literatura, Ciencias y Artes: Barcelona, Montaner y Simón, 1887–1899, reprints and appendices up to 1910: very readable articles, many written by known Spanish scholars of the day.; reprinted by the London editor Walter M. Jackson (C. H. Simonds Company, Impresores, Boston, Estados Unidos de Norte América)
Enciclonet
Enciclopedia Combi Visual
Enciclopedia Cousteau Mundo Submarino
Enciclopedia Estudiantil Editorial Codex
La Enciclopedia del Estudiante
Enciclopedia Encarta
Enciclopedia Jurídica Online: from Lawi; for Latin America and Spain; available online; edited by lawyers and academics
Enciclopedia Labor
Enciclopedia Libre Universal: also known as Enciclopedia Libre
Enciclopedia Salvat
Enciclopedia Temática Guinness
Enciclopedia universal ilustrada europeo-Americana: the biggest encyclopedia of its time; also known as Enciclopedia Espasa or Enciclopedia Espasa-Calpe
Enciclopedia Universal Micronet
Gran Enciclopedia Aragonesa
Gran Enciclopedia Asturiana
Gran Enciclopedia Extremeña
Gran Enciclopedia de Andalucía
Gran Enciclopedia Gallega
Gran enciclopedia planeta: 20 volumes, DVD and online encyclopedia, 2004
El Libro de los 1001 porqués
Lo sé todo
Monitor: enciclopedia Salvat para todos: 13 volumes, 1965–70
Nueva enciclopedia cumbre: published by Grolier in 14 volumes and available online
Nueva enciclopedia Durvan
El Nuevo Tesoro de la Juventud: published by Grolier in 20 volumes
Spanish Wikipedia (Wikipedia en español)

Swedish

Encyclopedias written in Swedish.

Bonniers familjelexikon (20 volumes, 1983–1986)
Bra böckers lexikon (4 editions of 25 volumes each, 1973–1995)
Focus (5 volumes, 1958–1960, introducing a new era of smaller modular encyclopedias, several later editions)
Kunskapens bok (6 editions, 8 or 9 volumes each, 1937–1959)
Lexikon 2000 (25 volumes, 1995)
Nationalencyklopedin (20 volumes, 1989–1996)
Nordisk familjebok (1876–1899; 2nd ed. 1904–1926)
Nordisk familjebok (editions 2-4 of 20+ volumes each, 1904–1957)
Susning.nu: a Swedish online wiki started in 2001; anyone-can-edit encyclopedia until 2004; shut down in 2009
Svensk uppslagsbok (2 editions, 31 and 32 volumes, 1929–1955)
Svenska uppslagsverk: a comprehensive bibliography maintained by collector Christofer Psilander
Swedish Wikipedia (Svenskspråkiga Wikipedia)

Tajik
Encyclopedia translated into Tajik.

Great Soviet Encyclopedia

Tamil
Encyclopedias written in Tamil.
 Kalaikkaḷañciyam (Encyclopedia) (தமிழில் கலைக்களஞ்சியம்) - 10 voiumes. 15,000 articles.
 Kulandaikal Kalaikkaḷañciyam (Children's Encyclopedia) - 10 volumes
 Arivyal Kalaikkaḷañciyam (Science Encyclopedia) 19 volumes (Tanjavur Tamil University)
 Vazviyal Kalaikkaḷañciyam (Humanities Encyclopedia) 15 volumes (Tanjavur Tamil University)
 Marutuva Kalaikkaḷañciyam, (Medical Encyclopedia) - 14 volumes.
 Isai Kalaikkaḷañciyam (Music Encyclopedia) - 3 volumes
Encyclopædia Britannica: 28,000 articles: a three-volume encyclopaedia of selected articles from the English version and special articles on Tamil culture and history (பிரிட்டானிக்கா தகவல் களஞ்சியம்)
Encyclopaedia of Herbs (மூலிகைக் கலைக்களஞ்சியம்)
Islamic Encyclopaedia: written by Abdul Raheem (இஸ்லாமியக் கலைக்களஞ்சியம்)
Tamil Wikipedia: Currently has 1,38,627 articles on various fields; one of the main resources for articles in Tamil language

Thai
 Thai Junior Encyclopedia (สารานุกรมไทยฉบับเยาวชน)
 Thai Wikipedia

Turkish
Encyclopedias written in Turkish.

 Anabritannica

Turkmen
Encyclopedia translated into Turkmen.

Great Soviet Encyclopedia

Ukrainian
Encyclopedias written in Ukrainian.

 Encyclopedia of Cybernetics (Енциклопедія кібернетики)
 Encyclopedia of Ecology (Екологічна енциклопедія)
 Encyclopedia of Education (Енциклопедія освіти)
 Encyclopedia of History of Ukraine (Енциклопедія історії України)
 Encyclopedia of Literature Studies (Енциклопедія літературознавства)
 Encyclopedia of Modern Ukraine (Енциклопедія сучасної України)
 Encyclopedia of Psychology (Психологічна енциклопедія)
 Encyclopedia of Sociology (Соціологічна енциклопедія)
 Encyclopedia of the Ukrainian Language (Енциклопедія "Українська мова")
 Encyclopedia of Ukrainіan Studies (Енциклопедія українознавства)
 Encyclopedia of Ukrainіan Diaspora (Енциклопедія української діаспори)
 Encyclopedic Dictionary of Astronomy (Астрономічний енциклопедичний словник)
 Encyclopedic Dictionary of Philosophy (Філософський енциклопедичний словник)
 Encyclopedic Dictionary of Political Science (Політологічний енциклопедичний словник)
 Encyclopedia Leopoliensis (Енциклопедія Львова)
 Geographical Encyclopedia of Ukraine (Географічна енциклопедія України)
 Legal Encyclopedia (Юридична енциклопедія)
 Medical Encyclopedia (Медична енциклопедія)
 Mining Encyclopedia (Гірнича енциклопедія)
 Mining Encyclopediс Dictionary (Гірничий енциклопедичний словник)
 Pharmaceutical Encyclopedia (Фармацевтична енциклопедія)
 Shevchenko Encyclopedia (Шевченківська енциклопедія)
 Ternopil Encyclopedic Dictionary (Тернопільський енциклопедичний словник)
 Ukrainian Agricultural Encyclopedia (Українська сільськогосподарська енциклопедія)
 Ukrainian Diplomatic Encyclopedia (Українська дипломатична енциклопедія)
 Ukrainian Encyclopedia of Jazz (Українська енциклопедія джазу)
 Ukrainian General Encyclopedia (Українська загальна енциклопедія)
 Ukrainian Literary Encyclopedia (Українська літературна енциклопедія)
 Ukrainian Pedagogical Encyclopedic Dictionary (Український педагогічний енциклопедичний словник)
 Ukrainian Small Encyclopedia (Українська мала енциклопедія)
 Ukrainian Soviet Encyclopedia (Українська радянська енциклопедія)
 Ukrainian Soviet Encyclopedic Dictionary (Український радянський енциклопедичний словник)
 Universal Encyclopedic Dictionary (Універсальний словник-енциклопедія, 1999, last updated in 2006)
 Ukrainian Wikipedia (Українська Вікіпедія)

Urdu
Encyclopedias written in Urdu.

 Bahar-e-Shariat
 Minhaj ul Muslimeen
 Urdu Encyclopaedia of Islam
 Urdu Wikipedia

Uzbek

Uzbek Soviet Encyclopedia (1971–80; 14 vol.)
Uzbek National Encyclopedia (2000–06; 12 vol.)

Vietnamese

Encyclopedias written in Vietnamese.
 Lịch triều hiến chương loại chí
 Từ điển Bách khoa toàn thư Việt Nam

Welsh
Encyclopedias written in Welsh.

Encyclopaedia Cambrensis (Gwyddoniadur Cymraeg)
Gwyddoniadur Cymru yr Academi Gymreig (also in English)

See also 
 Lists of encyclopedias

References

 
Lists of encyclopedias
Encyclopedias
Lists of reference books